True Orthodox church, True Orthodox Christians, True Orthodoxy or Genuine Orthodoxy, often pejoratively "Zealotry", designates groups of traditionalist Eastern Orthodox churches which have severed communion since the 1920s with the mainstream Eastern Orthodox churches for various reasons, such as calendar reform, the involvement of mainstream Eastern Orthodox Churches in ecumenism, or the refusal to submit to the authority of mainstream Eastern Orthodox churches. The True Orthodox church in the Soviet Union was also called the Catacomb Church; the True Orthodox in Romania, Bulgaria, Greece and Cyprus are usually called Old Calendarists.

History

The reformed church calendar was adopted by the mainstream Eastern Orthodox churches of Greece and Romania in 1924. At the moment of this adoption, True Orthodoxy began as Old Calendarism. True Orthodox were only laypeople and monks until 1935 when three bishops of the Church of Greece joined the movement in Greece; in 1955, one bishop of the Romanian Orthodox Church joined the movement in Romania. In the Soviet Union, the True Orthodox began in 1927-8 when some Eastern Orthodox Christians, among which some were "senior and respected bishops", severed communion with the Moscow Patriarchate.

The True Orthodox movement remained united in Romania. However, in Greece in 1937 the Greek Old Calendarists "divided"; the reason for their division is a disagreement on whether the sacraments performed by members of churches which have adopted the reformed calendar are valid or not.

In 1971, the Russian Orthodox Church Outside of Russia tried to unite the factions of Greek Old Calendarists, but failed. In 1999, the most important groups of Greek Old Calendarists were the Chrysostomites, the Matthewites, and the Cyprianites.

After the ROCOR opened its first parishes in 1990 in Russia, many Christians from the Catacomb Church joined them.

Doctrine
The True Orthodox churches are "fully [Eastern] Orthodox in dogma and ritual".

Denominations
There is no single denomination nor organization called the "True Orthodox Church" nor is there official recognition among the "True Orthodox" as to who is properly included among them.

Denominations that are usually included in the True Orthodoxy are:

 Old Calendarists
 Greek Old Calendarists
 Holy Synod of Milan
 Autonomous Orthodox Metropolia of North and South America and the British Isles
 Autonomous Orthodox Metropolis of Ecuador and Latin America
 True Orthodox Metropolis of Germany and Europe
 Old Calendar Bulgarian Orthodox Church
 Old Calendarist Romanian Orthodox Church
 Russian Orthodox Autonomous Church
 Latvian Orthodox Autonomous Church
 Russian True Orthodox Church (Lazar Zhurbenko)
 Some churches descending from the Russian Orthodox Church Outside Russia
 Serbian True Orthodox Church

Inter-church relations and intercommunion
Many True Orthodox synods do not publish information concerning other synods, citing limited interest outside of their locality. Some are open to dialogue, whereas some hierarchies are more insular and prefer to keep to themselves. For example, the Russian Orthodox Autonomous Church (ROAC) through the late Metropolitan Valentine, stated informally that they no longer actively seek to join other True Orthodox churches, but would not refuse incoming dialogue.

Demography 
In 1999, it was estimated that "[t]here are probably over one million Old Calendarists in Romania, somewhat fewer in Greece, and considerably fewer in Bulgaria, Cyprus, and the [Eastern Orthodox] diaspora."

Those who consider themselves a part of this movement are a minority of those who consider themselves to be Eastern Orthodox Christians.

See also
 Ancient Church of the East — an East Syriac Church, founded in 1968 after a split from the Assyrian Church of the East for similar reasons
 Christian fundamentalism
 Old Believers — A collective group of independent Russian Orthodox Christians who maintain the liturgical and ritual practices of the Eastern Orthodox Church as they existed prior to the reforms of Patriarch Nikon of Moscow between 1652 and 1666
 Traditionalist Catholicism — Catholics who object to the reforms of the Second Vatican Council, sometimes embracing sedevacantism
Independent sacramental movement

References

Eastern Orthodox belief and doctrine
True Orthodox denominations
Eastern Orthodoxy-related controversies